Monte Gordo may refer to:

 Monte Gordo, Cape Verde, the tallest mountain on the island of São Nicolau, Cape Verde
 Monte Gordo (Vila Real de Santo António), a civil parish in the municipality of Vila Real de Santo António, Algarve, Portugal

See also
 Montegordo